Cyperus duclouxii is a species of sedge that is native to central and southern China.

See also 
 List of Cyperus species

References 

duclouxii
Plants described in 1910
Flora of China
Taxa named by Edmond Gustave Camus